Philomena McDonagh (also known as Phylomena McDonagh) is an English actress and writer best known for her roles as art teacher June Summers in Grange Hill and Carol Nelson in ITV soap opera Emmerdale. McDonagh acted in Phil Young's play, "Crystal Clear" at the Wyndham's Theatre in London, England with Anthony Allen and Diana Barrett in the cast. Phil Young was also director. She has also written films and for television, notably the film adaptation of Far from the Madding Crowd.

Career

Acting
McDonagh first appeared in acting in 1975, in play for today, playing Nurse O'Malley. She was credited as Phylomena McDonagh. In 1979, she played June Summers the art teacher in the children's drama series Grange Hill. In the same year, she appeared in Angels as Sister Moran. In 1980, she appeared in a short sketch called The Errand. She also appeared in BBC2 Playhouse in Happy, as Barbara. She appeared on stage in 1983 in the female lead in Phil Young's play Chrystal Clear as Thomasina, a girl who has been blind since birth, and falls in love with Richard, a man whose relationship is failing with Jane, his current girlfriend. In 1987, she played her first of two appearances in The Bill, as Mrs. Bradford in "Domestics". She appeared again two years later as Janet Watson in "Woman In Brown". In 1991, McDonagh joined the cast of the ITV soap opera Emmerdale as Carol Nelson, a girl who Archie Brooks falls for and dates. They split up later. In 2010, after a seventeen-year break from acting, she appeared in Little Crackers.

Writing
McDonagh has written films and television. Her first work was the film adaptation of Chrystal Clear in 1988,  which she had appeared in five years previously. Her next work was ten years later, the film adaptation of the novel Far from the Madding Crowd. In the same year, she wrote the film King's Girl. In 2005, she wrote an episode of Agatha Christie's Poirot.

Credits

Television

Film

Theatre

Writing Credits

References

External links

English television actresses
Living people
Year of birth missing (living people)